MJL can refer to:

mjl, the ISO 639-3 code for the Mandeali language
Movimiento Juvenil Lautaro, the Lautaro Youth Movement